One Life is a 2003 Russian drama film directed by Vitaliy Moskalenko.

Plot 
The film tells about a woman who could not forgive her husband the intrigue with the secretary and completely gave herself to journalism, which caused serious health problems, as a result of which she went to rest in a sanatorium.

Cast 
 Tatyana Yakovenko
 Aleksey Nilov
 Sergey Bezrukov
 Tatyana Lyutaeva
 Aleksey Kravchenko
 Aleksandr Makarov
 Tatyana Orlova

References

External links 
 

2003 films
2000s Russian-language films
Russian drama films
2003 drama films